Ephraim Eldorus Stevens (January 12, 1851July 20, 1907) was an American architect, Republican politician, and Wisconsin pioneer. He was the 28th mayor of Oshkosh, Wisconsin, and represented Winnebago County in the Wisconsin Senate during the 1905 session.

Biography
Ephraim Stevens was born in the town of Knox, Maine, in January 1851.  When he was an infant, he came with his parents and siblings to Oshkosh, Wisconsin, where he would live out the rest of his life.  He was educated in the public schools and studied masonry.  In 1868, he went to Green Bay, Wisconsin, where he apprenticed in under architect D. M. Harteau, and later partnered with him in the firm Harteau & Stevens.

He returned to Oshkosh and became one of the more prominent architects in the city, responsible for a number of schools and public buildings.  

He served several years on the Oshkosh city council and was elected mayor of Oshkosh in 1889, running on the Republican Party ticket.  Stevens convinced the city to purchase two parks during his term and was known as the "Parks mayor".  He was active in the local Republican Party and was chairman of the city and county Republican committees several times.

In August 1903, incumbent state senator Christian Sarau died less than a year into his four-year term.  A special election was called for the fall of 1904.  Stevens received the county Republican endorsement over incumbent state representative William C. Cowling.  Stevens was seen as more in line with the progressive agenda of Governor Robert M. La Follette.  He prevailed in the general election with 57% of the vote.

Despite coming into office as a La Follette supporter, he had a falling out with the progressive faction and lost the 1906 primary to John A. Fridd.  Stevens chose to run as an Independent Republican, but came in a distant 3rd in the 1906 general election.

A short time after the 1906 election, Stevens began suffering from bronchitis, followed by pneumonia.  By May, he was bedridden and died July 20, 1907.

Personal life and legacy
Ephraim was one of six children born to Hiram and Rosella ( Cross) Stevens.  Hiram Stevens was involved in the lumber industry in Oshkosh, but enlisted for service in the Union Army during the American Civil War.  He served with the 3rd Wisconsin Cavalry Regiment but was discharged due to disease after one year of service and died four months later, in March 1863.

He married Margaret Jacobs on February 23, 1974.  They had five daughters together, who all survived him.

Stevens Park in Oshkosh is named in his honor.

Electoral history

Wisconsin Senate (1904, 1906)

| colspan="6" style="text-align:center;background-color: #e9e9e9;"| General Election, November 8, 1904

| colspan="6" style="text-align:center;background-color: #e9e9e9;"| General Election, November 2, 1906

References

1851 births
1907 deaths
People from Waldo County, Maine
People from Oshkosh, Wisconsin
Architects from Wisconsin
Mayors of places in Wisconsin
Republican Party Wisconsin state senators